Denny or Dennie may refer to:

People
Denny (given name), a list of people named Denny or Dennie
Denny (surname), a list of people surnamed Denny or Dennie
Denny (hybrid hominin)

Places
Denny, California, a ghost town
Denny, Falkirk, a town in Scotland
Dennyloanhead, an adjoining village
Denny Island, in the Severn Estuary, between England and Wales
Denny Island (Canada), British Columbia
Denny Triangle, Seattle, a neighborhood in the United States
Denny Run, a stream in the U.S. state of Missouri
23257 Denny, an asteroid named after Bob Denny

Other uses
Denny Abbey, a former abbey in Cambridgeshire, England
Denny baronets, three baronetcies
Denny Party, American pioneer group
Denny's, a large restaurant chain
Denny Field (Alabama), former home stadium for the University of Alabama football team
Denny Field (Washington), former home grounds for the University of Washington football team
William Denny and Brothers, often referred to as "Denny", Scottish shipbuilding firm in business from 1840 to 1963

See also
Dennys (disambiguation)
Denis (disambiguation)